The National University of Rosario (UNR) is a research public university located in the city of Rosario, province of Santa Fe, Argentina.

Overview
Rosario National University (UNR) was created in 1968 by Law 17.987. Its foundational structure consisted of numerous academic and administrative entities belonging to the Rosario campus of the National University of the Littoral, established in 1918. The schools incorporated in the original university at the time included: the Colleges of Medicine, Biochemistry Sciences, Engineering, Architecture, Economic Sciences, Humanities and Arts, Law, Psychology, Political Sciences, Odontology, Agricultural Sciences, Veterinarian Sciences.  Other institutions under the original university's aegis included hospitals and secondary schools, the Rosario Music Institute, the Fine Arts Institute, and the Center of Foreign and Modern Languages.

From its beginnings Rosario National University promoted an active relationship with Rosario society. This relationship allowed it to complete every initiated project and sustain growth in accordance to regional demands. Its present structure consists of 12 colleges, 3 high schools and one interdisciplinary academy. It has a building surface of 68,000 square meters (730,000 ft²), where the following academic courses are provided: 171 postgraduate courses, 63 college degrees, 15 technical degrees, 53 intermediate level college degrees, 26 degrees for articulation with the non-university higher education system, and 32 professional degrees (non university post-secondary degrees). An on-line campus was later incorporated, providing distance learning courses by using Web support as a teaching tool.

Rosario National University is committed to: "providing higher education with scientific characteristics towards the formation of researchers, professionals and technicians with broad cultural integration, capable and conscious of their social responsibility, and with the duty of fostering interrelationships among faculty, graduates and students through national and international scientific and cultural centers."

Academic units 
 Facultad de Ciencias Exactas, Ingeniería y Agrimensura 
 Surveying
 Civil Engineering
 Electrical Engineering
 Electronic Engineering
 Industrial Engineering
 Mechanical Engineering
 Physics
 Mathematics
 Computer Science
 Teacher of Mathematics
 Facultad de Ciencia Política y Relaciones Internacionales 
 Political Science
 International Relations
 Social Communication
 Social Work
 Facultad de Ciencias Médicas 
 Medicine
 Nursery
 Phonaudiology
 Facultad de Ciencias Bioquímicas y Farmacéuticas 
 Biochemical
 Pharmacy
 Biotechnology
 Chemistry
 Teacher of Chemistry
 Facultad de Arquitectura, Planeamiento y Diseño 
 Architecture
 Facultad de Derecho 
 Law
 Notary public
 Facultad de Odontología 
 Odontology
 Facultad de Ciencias Agrarias 
 Agronomy
 Facultad de Ciencias Veterinarias 
 Veterinary medicine
 Facultad de Ciencias Económicas y Estadística 
 Public Accountant
 Administration
 Economy
 Statistic
 Teacher of Accounting
 Teacher of Economy
 Teacher of Statistic
 Logistics
 Facultad de Psicología 
 Psychology
 Teacher of Psychology
 Facultad de Humanidades y Artes 
 Anthropology
 Philosophy
 History
 Fine Arts
 Spanish Language and Literature
 Portuguese
 Education Sciences
 Musical Education
 Instrumentation
 Song
 Composition
 Teacher of Philosophy
 Teacher of History
 Teacher of Spanish Language and Literature
 Teacher of Education Sciences
 Teacher of Instrumentation
 Teacher of Song
 Teacher of Composition
 Teacher of Music in Basic General Education
 Teacher of Musical Education

Preparatory schools 
 Instituto Politécnico Superior "General San Martín" 
 Escuela Superior de Comercio "Libertador General San Martín" 
 Escuela Agrotécnica "Libertador Gral. San Martín"

Notable faculty
 Beppo Levi (1875-1961) - mathematician
 Gregorio Baro (1928-2012) - chemist
 Eliseo Verón (1935-2014) - sociologist, anthropologist
 Delia Crovi Druetta - communications
 María Eugenia Bielsa (born 1958) - architect

Notable alumni
 Hermes Binner (1943-2020) physician and politician
 Rafael Bielsa (born 1953) - politician
 Miguel Lifschitz (1955-2001) - politician
 Rubén Giustiniani (born 1955) - politician
 Agustín Rossi (born 1959) - engineer and politician
 José Cura (born 1962) - tenor, conductor
 Jana Rodriguez Hertz (b. 1970), Argentine and Uruguayan mathematician
 Federico Rodriguez Hertz (born 1973) - mathematician
 Luciano Marraffini (born 1974) - microbiologist
 Rachel Chan - biologist
 Alejandrina Cristia - linguist and research director

See also
List of universities in Argentina
Science and technology in Argentina
Argentine university reform of 1918

References

 
1968 establishments in Argentina
Rosario
Educational institutions established in 1968
Universities in Santa Fe Province